Anil Jasinghe is a Sri Lankan medical administrator who is currently Secretary of the Ministry of Environment of Sri Lanka. Previously, he was the Director-General of Health Services in Sri Lankan Ministry of Health, Nutrition and Indigenous Medicine from December 2017 to August 2020, which included the early phase of the COVID-19 Pandemic.

Born in Kamburupitiya, Matara district, Jasinghe was educated at Mahinda College and Ananda College. He graduated from Lvov State Medical Institute,  and holds a M.Sc. in Community Medicine and MD in Medical Administration from Postgraduate Institute of Medicine in Sri Lanka. In 2011 he obtained Master of Public Administration (MPA) from Postgraduate Institute of Management of University of Sri Jayewardenepura.

References

Living people
21st-century Sri Lankan politicians
Sri Lankan medical doctors
Alumni of Mahinda College
Alumni of Ananda College
Year of birth missing (living people)

Health officials
Sri Lankan government officials